Francisco Montes may be:
Francisco Montes Reina
Francisco Montes de Oca y Saucedo
Francisco Montes (footballer)